Fiorello Giraud (22 October 1870 – 28 March 1928) was an Italian operatic tenor who sang leading roles in many Italian opera houses during the course of his career, including La Scala, the Teatro Regio di Parma, and the Teatro Regio di Torino, as well as in Spain, Portugal, and Latin America. He is remembered today for having created the role of Canio in the world premiere of Leoncavallo's Pagliacci.

Life
Giraud was born in Parma, the son of the tenor Lodovico Giraud, and began studying singing with Barbacini at the Parma Conservatory. He made his stage debut in December 1891 at the Teatro Civico in Vercelli as Lohengrin. The following year he sang Canio in the world premiere of Pagliacci at the Teatro Dal Verme in Milan, a role which he sang many more times in his career. Most of his roles were in the lyric tenor and spinto tenor Italian repertoire. However, later in his career his voice had become heavy enough to take on further Wagnerian roles such as Tristan in Tristan und Isolde, Walther in Die Meistersinger von Nürnberg, and Siegfried in the first performance of Götterdämmerung at La Scala.

After he retired from the stage, he taught singing in Parma where he died in 1928 at the age of 57.

Recordings
According to the Marston website (4):

References
4. https://www.marstonrecords.com/products/italian-tenors, accessed 26/4/2019

Italian operatic tenors
1870 births
1928 deaths
19th-century Italian male opera singers
Musicians from Parma